Joanna Mansell was a popular writer of 23 romance novels from 1986 to 1995, who loved gardening and past times spent daydreaming

Bibliography

Single novels 
 The Night Is Dark (1986)
 Sleeping Tiger (1986)
 Black Diamond (1987)
 Miracle Man (1987)
 Illusion of Paradise (1988)
 Lord and Master (1988)
 The Third Kiss (1988)
 Wild Justice (1988)
 Night with a Stranger (1989)
 The Seduction of Sara (1989)
 Devil in Paradise (1990)
 A Kiss By Candlelight (1990)
 Egyptian Nights (1990)
 Haunted Summer (1990)
 Past Secrets (1990)
 Land of Dragons (1991)
 Istanbul Affair (1991)
 Forgotten Fire (1992)
 Secrets of the Night (1992)
 The Touch of Aphrodite (1993)
 Portrait of Cleo (1993)
 A Perfect Seduction (1994)
 Dark Temptation (1995)

References

External links 
 Joanna Mansell's Webpage in Fantastic Fiction's Website

English romantic fiction writers
Women romantic fiction writers
Living people
Year of birth missing (living people)